Jaegal Sung-yeol (Hangul: 제갈성렬, Hanja: 諸葛成烈) (born 24 March 1970 in Uijeongbu, Gyeonggi-do) is a former speed skater from South Korea. At the 1992 Winter Olympics, he finished 12th in the 500 m short track speed skating.

References
 Skateresults.com 
 

1970 births
Living people
South Korean male speed skaters
Olympic speed skaters of South Korea
Speed skaters at the 1992 Winter Olympics
Speed skaters at the 1994 Winter Olympics
Speed skaters at the 1998 Winter Olympics
Dankook University alumni
People from Uijeongbu
Asian Games medalists in speed skating
Speed skaters at the 1990 Asian Winter Games
Speed skaters at the 1996 Asian Winter Games
Speed skaters at the 1999 Asian Winter Games
Asian Games gold medalists for South Korea
Asian Games silver medalists for South Korea
Medalists at the 1996 Asian Winter Games
Medalists at the 1999 Asian Winter Games
Namyang Jegal clan
Sportspeople from Gyeonggi Province
21st-century South Korean people
20th-century South Korean people